Oxborough is a village in Norfolk, England. It may also refer to:

People with the surname
 Thomas Oxborough (died 1623), English lawyer and politician

Other
 Operation Oxborough, name for the investigation into the murder of Jill Dando
 Oxborough Dirk, ceremonial weapon
 Oxborough v North Harbour Builders Ltd, New Zealand court case

See also
 Oxburgh Hall
 Henry Oxburgh, Irish Jacobite executed in 1716